Hasanganj is a village and tehsil headquarters in Unnao district of Uttar Pradesh, India. It is located near Mohan, at a road junction leading to Miyanganj and Rasulabad. As of 2011, its population is 4,658, in 818 households.

Hasanganj hosts two fairs: the Jal Bihar cattle fair on Bhadra Badi 2-4, and the Kans Lila fair on Bhadra Sudi 3. At both events, vendors bring sweets, clay toys, and articles of daily use to sell. Hasanganj also holds a market on Tuesdays and Fridays where grain and vegetables are sold.

History 
Hasanganj was originally a bazaar founded by Hasan Raza Khan, a naib in the service of Asaf-ud-Daula, in the village of Mahadeopur Balamau. It became a tehsil headquarters around 1890, replacing Mohan in this capacity, and the police station was transferred to Hasanganj at the same time.

At the turn of the 20th century, Hasanganj was centred around "a wide street lined with trees and shops on both sides." It was a minor commercial centre and had, in addition to the tehsil office and police station, a dispensary and a road bungalow, as well as an upper primary school with 32 students. Most of the locals were Banias and agriculturalists, and the population in 1901 was 1,310, including a Muslim minority of 255 people.

The 1961 census recorded Hasanganj as comprising 3 hamlets, with a total population of 1,461 (828 male and 633 female), in 268 households and 245 physical houses. The area of the village was given as 318 acres. Average attendance of the biweekly market was about 400. Average attendance at both the Jal Bihar and Kans Lila fairs was recorded as 2,000 people. The police station had a staff of 2 sub-inspectors, 1 head constable, and 14 constables at the time.

Villages 
Hasanganj CD block has the following 156 villages:

References

Villages in Unnao district